The Manvils are a Canadian rock band from Vancouver. The band consists of the singer, songwriter and guitarist Mikey Manville, bass guitarist Dave Fenton and drummer Jay Koenderman.

The Manvils have appeared on stage with Stereophonics, Suicide Girls, The Bellrays, The Horror Pops. Metric, De La Soul, Jarvis Cocker, Bif Naked, Sonic Youth, Ben Harper and The Relentless7, Daniel Wesley and Dragonette.

The band signed a recording contract with the Vancouver indie label Sandbag Records in early 2008.

In 2008, The Manvils began writing and recording an album with the producer, Ryan Dahle (Limblifter/Age of Electric). Recorded at The Factory and The RecRoom (Greenhouse Studios), the new album was finished in early 2009. The Manvils was released in Canada on August 11, 2009, through Fontana North Distribution.

The Manvils relocated to Toronto, Ontario in the fall of 2011 and Jason Skiendziel was brought on board to replace Greg Buhr on bass guitar.  Dave Fenton replaced Jason Skiendziel on bass in May 2018 at the Mod Club Theatre in Toronto.

Media
The band appeared on the front page of the popular Canadian arts magazine ION in the April 2006 edition.
Their music has been used in films and television including the award-winning CBC Television documentary series Moscow Freestyle and a 2007 Budweiser beer commercial.
The soundtrack to the 2008 horror movie Never Cry Werewolf includes eight tracks from Buried Love and two tracks from Manville's 2007 solo album Broken Arms.

Current band members
Mikey Manville (vocals/guitars)
Dave Fenton (bass guitar/vocals)
Jay Koenderman (drums/vocals)

Discography

Albums

References
Citations

External links
 The Manvils official website
 Straight.com review
 Popmatters.com review

Musical groups established in 2005
Musical groups from Vancouver
Canadian indie rock groups
2005 establishments in British Columbia